Minkowskie  (German: Seydlitzruh) is a village in the administrative district of Gmina Namysłów, within Namysłów County, Opole Voivodeship, in south-western Poland. 

The village has a population of 440.

References

Minkowskie